Manam is a Kairiru–Manam language spoken mainly on the volcanic Manam Island, northeast of New Guinea.

Phonology

Vowels

Consonants

Allophony
Some vowels become glides in diphthongs, e.g.

Syllable structure
The Manam syllable is (C)(V1)V(V1)(C1), the only exception is a syllabic .

There are some phonotactic restrictions on the prevalent syllable structure. E.g. V1 cannot be , whereas V must be  as long as it is not the syllable's sole vowel. C can be any consonant, whereas C1 must be a nasal consonant.

Stress
Stress is phonemic:  'palm tree',  'seagull'. The stress falls on one of the three last syllables of a word, and stressing the penult syllable is the most common:  'child',  'work'. If the last syllable ends in a nasal consonant, it will be stressed instead:  'your child'. Some inflections and affixes do not alter the stress of the root word:  'he learned' (i- is a 3rd person prefix),  'in the bush' (-lo is a locative suffix).

In the orthography, stressed vowels can be underlined in order to avoid ambiguities. Ie.   'palm tree',   'seagull'.

Syntax

Word order 
The basic, unmarked word order in Manam is SOV:

Predicator 
Lichtenberk defines the predicator as the primary element within a clause. The predicator of a Manam clause can be realised in a variety of different ways, such as verb phrases Ex. (1), noun phrases Ex. (2), postpositional phrases Ex. (3), numbers Ex. (4), etc.

Ex. (1): verb phrase predicator

Ex. (2): noun phrase predicator

Ex. (3): postpositional phrase predicator

Ex. (4): numeral predicator

Negation 

Scope of negation 
The spectrum of scope runs from negating one or more elements within a single clause, to negating an entire clause. The concept of scope of negation can be demonstrated in English: 'I did not go to the party' is an example of a broad scope of negation, i.e. the verb phrase (VP) is negated; therefore, the act of going to the party is negated; 'not one person went to the party' is an example of a narrow scope of negation, i.e. the subject is negated, not the act of going to the party.

Broad scope 
A broad scope of negation is expressed in Manam by negating the predicator—this is done so by placing the negative marker  before the predicator, as demonstrated in the following examples:

Ex. (5): broad scope negation–1 element

Ex. (6): broad scope negation–2 elements

Ex. (7): broad scope negation–3 elements

Additionally, the negative marker  can also function as a predicator of existential and possessive clauses. Compare the following examples:

Ex. (8): negative existential sentence

Ex. (9): negative possessive sentence

Narrow scope 
As a general rule, Manam primarily expresses narrow scope negation by placing  before the element which is being negated i.e. the object of focused negation within the clause.

Ex. (10): narrow scope negation

In example (10), it is not the act of coming that is being negated; rather the negation is narrowly focused in negating the presence of the brother.

Ex. (11): narrow scope negation

Similarly, in example (11), it is not the act of calling one's name that is being negated, rather the negation focuses the fact that someone was called, but by some other name that was not their own.

Negative quantifiers 
Additionally, the negative marker  can be used in conjunction with the quantifiers  'one' and  'some' to produce the negative expressions,  'no, not any' and  'no, not any'. These expressions function as attributes within the noun phrases that they modify, as seen in the following examples (NP are enclosed within brackets):

Ex. (12): negation using 

Ex. (13): negation using 

More specifically,  is used to modify noun phrases whose head are mass nouns;  comparatively modifies count nouns. Compare the following two examples:

Ex. (14): negative quantifier mass noun

Ex. (15): negative quantifier count noun

Intensified negation 

Ex. (16): intensifier suffix

The buffer element , however, is not included when  acts as the predicator of a clause, as seen in the following example:

Ex. (17): intensified predicator

Additionally, negation in Manam can be intensified using  'little', as seen in the following example:

Ex. (18): intensifier 

Moreover,  'little' can be used in conjunction with  within the same clause, as seen in the following example:

Ex. (19): intensifier  + suffix 

Furthermore, the suffix  may be appended to the prohibitive marker  (with the presence of the buffer ), as seen in the following example:

Ex. (20): suffix  + prohibitive marker

Prohibitions 
Manam expresses prohibitions in two basic ways: using finite verbs—defined as verb (phrase) forms that can occur on their own in a main clause; using gerunds and verbal nouns. Lichtenberk defines gerunds as verb nuclei used to indicate 'non-specific' events, whereas verbal nouns are used to indicate ‘specific’ events. Compare the following examples:

Ex. (21): gerund

Ex. (22): verbal noun

Prohibitive constructions with finite verbs 
The basic structure of prohibitive constructions using finite verbs is  followed by a verb with a realis subject/mood prefix, as seen in the following examples:

Ex. (23): prohibitive construction finite verb

Ex. (24): prohibitive construction finite verb w/ subject NP

Ex. (25): prohibitive construction finite verb w/ direct object NP

Ex. (26): prohibitive construction finite verb

Prohibitive constructions with gerunds and verbal nouns 
Prohibitive constructions using gerunds or verbal nouns are formed by placing the prohibitive/negative marker  after the gerund or verbal noun, demonstrated in the following example:

Ex. (27): prohibitive construction using gerund/verbal noun

The distinction between using a gerund or a verbal noun is determined by whether the source verb is transitive (verbal noun) or intransitive (gerund).

Additionally, the form  'never mind' may also be used in forming prohibitive constructions using gerunds and verbal nouns. The location of  within the clause is more dynamic than the prohibitive/negative marker , as  may occur both following or preceding the verbal noun or gerund. Compare the following two examples:

Ex. (28): prohibitive construction using  (following)

Ex. (29): prohibitive construction using  (preceding)

Indirect prohibitive constructions 
The negative marker  is used when expressing prohibitions in indirect speech—its behaviour is identical as in its regular usage:  is placed before the element which is being negated, as seen in the following example:

Ex. (30): indirect prohibitive construction

Morphology

Number
Manam has an unusual, though regionally common, four-way distinction between singular, dual, paucal, and plural number. Singular and plural are marked on the verb and sometimes on the adjective, but not on the noun.

Pronouns

Reduplication
Reduplication can be either leftward or rightward. There is no point in distinguishing 'partial' and 'total' reduplication, since at most two syllables are reduplicated.

Nouns
Rightwards reduplicated nouns can either take on a meaning related to the original word, or function as an agentive marker:

{| border="0" cellspacing="0" cellpadding="2" style="border-collapse:collapse"
|-
|||snake
|-
|||worm
|-
|colspan="3"|
|-
|||the work
|-
|||worker
|}

Adjectives
Here are two examples of how number can be marked on the adjective through the different kinds of reduplication:

Rightward reduplication (singular)
{| border="0" cellspacing="0" cellpadding="2" style="border-collapse:collapse"
|-
|||ripe banana
|-
|||the big man
|}

Leftward reduplication (plural)
{| border="0" cellspacing="0" cellpadding="2" style="border-collapse:collapse"
|-
|||ripe bananas
|-
|||the big men
|}

Verb aspects

The verb
The verb always marks the subject and the mood; these are fused together. Optional suffixes include such things as object, direction, aspectual markers, benefactive and various kinds of intensifiers and quantifiers.
Here is a schematical overview of the Manam verb:

Subject marking
The marking of subject is obligatory. In addition to expressing number and person, the pronouns have fused with the mood markers (see below) called realis and irrealis.

Mood
The realis mood is used for actual events of the past or present, i.e. things that are certain to have happened, things that are "real". Accordingly, the irrealis mood describes anticipated events in the future, or events that the speaker wishes were real.

Manner prefixes
Manner prefixes are found between the subject/mood marker and the verb root. The manner prefixes describe in what manner the verb action was done, such as 'biting', 'cutting', 'throwing' etc.

Object marking

Transitivization
There are three different morphologically overt methods for turning intransitive verbs into transitive ones:
 The prefix  can occur between the person/mood marker and the verb root.
 The suffix  can occur between the verb root and the outer suffixes.
 The so-called "transitive consonant" (TC) can occur between the verb root and the outer suffixes.

These methods can be combined.

Optional suffixes
The object suffixes are also optional, but rather common. Here are a few examples of some of the more unusual suffix types:

Direction

Spreading

Intensifying

Benefactive

Adjectives
Most adjectives are derived by reduplication from a verb or a noun. As seen above, some reduplicated adjectives have a number distinction, but some others do not, e.g.  'small' (singular and plural). Some adjectives use the possessive pronouns to mark person and number, e.g.  'selfish' (singular) and  'selfish' (plural).

Possession
As in many other Austronesian languages, Manam expresses different degrees of possession. In addition to the most common differentiation between alienable and inalienable possession, Manam uses a particular morphological processes to describe belongings that are edible or associated with eating.

Possessive pronouns

Inalienable possession
In this class are 'belongings' that are involuntary, such as body parts, family members and different kinds of necessary 'parts of a whole'. This class is characterized by simply a possessive suffix attached to the word in question:

Edible possession
In this class are things that are edible and 'used to obtain, prepare or store food'. This class is characterized by the word , which is placed after the possessed thing and to which the possessive suffix is attached:

Alienable possession
In this class are belongings that are voluntary; things that one can cease to own, unlike body parts or family. This class is characterized by the word , which is placed after the possessed thing and to which the possessive suffix is attached:

Cross-class possession
One notable aspect is that the same word can occur in all three possession classes, and then of course its meaning will differ. Here are two examples:

Demonstratives 
Manam has two kinds of demonstratives. This two-way system distinguishes between proximal demonstratives, which indicate proximity to a speaker, and distal demonstratives, which indicate distance from a speaker. Both demonstratives occur after the noun phrase. They are formed from the demonstrative marker , followed by either the proximal suffix  or the distal marker , followed by either the third-person singular marker -∅ or the third-person plural marker  as shown in the table below:

Data from WALS suggests that both the Austronesian and Papuan languages, which are geographically close to the Manam language community, show an approximately even distribution of two-way and three-way distinction systems for demonstratives. In fact, despite Ross's observation that "Schouten family members are … much more closely related to each other than to any other members of the [North New Guinea] Linkage", Kairiru, which like Manam is a member of the Schouten family, shows a three-way distinction in its demonstratives. The reconstructed proto language Proto-Oceanic (POc), from which the Schouten family is descended, was determined to have a three-way distinction system. POc's system is believed to have included an additional demonstrative compared to Manam, the medial demonstrative which indicates an intermediate distance, or proximity to the listener rather than the speaker. However, Manam does show the same noun-demonstrative word order which was reconstructed for POc.

It can also be cliticised to a proceeding word when it is not followed by a suffix. Because the 3sg adnominal suffix has a zero form,  can be cliticised for this construction. This means that Examples (1), (2), and (3) are all acceptable ways to construct 'this woman', while example (4) but not Example (5) is an acceptable construction of 'these women'.

It is also acceptable to remove the head noun, for instance in the comparative construction in Example (6).

Selective forms of proximal demonstratives 
A selective form can be derived from the proximal demonstrative (but not the distal demonstrative). It is formed by adding the suffix  after the proximal marker and before the adnominal suffix, as per Example (7) below, and indicates selection out of a set or group of options.

The selective suffix is optional and is used when it is necessary to express selection explicitly. If not, the basic demonstrative can be used.

Anaphoric usage 
Previous examples of the use of the demonstrative in Manam have been exophoric, referring to the world outside of the text. However, they can also be used anaphorically, to reference something previously brought up by a speaker. Although Example (8) below demonstrates that both the proximal and the distal demonstrative can be used anaphorically, the proximal demonstrative is used much more commonly than the distal in this manner.

Usage of the proximal demonstrative as a resumptive pro-form 
A second anaphoric use of the proximal demonstrative in Manam is as a resumptive pro-form. In this situation, the proximal demonstrative is used to sum up or resume discussing a topic that has already been spoken about. It can be used in reference to a topic discussed within the same sentence, or in an earlier sentence. When it is used to reference a topic within one sentence, the resumptive pro-form will immediately follow its antecedent as in Example (9).

The singular form is also more common than the plural form. This can be seen in Example (10) where the singular form is used despite the pro-from referring to a group of items.

The resumptive pro-form can be used to reference a clause in order to indicate the time of a second clause, demonstrated by Example (11). It is also commonly used when a noun phrase is modified by a relative clause, as can be seen in Example (12).

It is also often used when a sentence is thematised, and can function similarly to a theme-marker even though it does not meet the requirements to be considered a thematiser. In Example (13) below,  ('your mattress') is the theme.

Directional system and spatial deixis 
Manam, like most Oceanic languages, primarily uses an absolute reference directional system, even on a local scale, (as opposed to many European languages which primarily use relative reference systems). This system is oriented on a land-sea axis. However, Manam's system is unique because it has taken on a circular nature, becoming intrinsically linked to the geography of the island which is almost perfectly circular. Below are the directional terms associated in Manam:

This directional system has only been attested in three languages: Manam, Boumaa Fijian, and Makian Taba.

The suffix  can be added to any of these terms to indicate movement towards that direction, as in Example (3). No suffix is needed to indicate movement away from a direction – this is inferred from the context of the sentence (contrast Examples (1) and (2) with Example (3)).

Spatial deixis 
Spatial deixis describes how speakers can 'point out' the location of an object in relationship to their own position. These two terms are used regardless of which direction the speaker is indicating. If it is necessary to specify direction, this can be done by adding the directional term after the deictical term, as is done in Example (4).

Manam has three additional spatial deixis, which are used to specify spatial relationships in a specific direction. These terms refer to the land-sea directional system described above, and are listed below: 

Interestingly, unlike Manam's two-way distinction for demonstratives, these directional spatial deictical terms show the same three-way distinction that was reconstructed for Proto-Oceanic (POc).  To indicate an intermediate distance, the distal suffix  can be added to each directional spatial deictic. If the object described is so far away as to be out of sight, the spatial dialectical term can be combined with a directional term to indicate extreme distance. This is illustrated in the table below:

Similar to directional terms, to indicate movement towards the most distant directional spatial dialectical terms, the suffix  is added as in Example (5). For the less distant terms, no affix is needed, illustrated by Example (6).

Abbreviations 
AD:adnominal
BF:buffer
DEMPROX:proximal demonstrative
DL:dual
EXC:exclusive
FOOD:edible
INIR:indefinite irrealis
IP:independent pronoun
IR:irregular
LIM:limiter
PROX:proximte
RESPRO:resumptive pro-form
RP:reflexive-possessive
RL:realis
RPL:reduplication
SEL:selective
SIM:simulative
TC:transitive consonant
TRANS:transitiviser

Resources
 Lichtenberk, Frantisek (1983) A grammar of Manam. Oceanic Linguistics Special Publication No. 18. Honolulu, University of Hawaii Press. (Available in JSTOR.)
 Turner, Blaine (1986) A teaching grammar of the Manam language
 Short description of Manam culture
 Paradisec has a number of collections with Manam materials
 Crystal, David (2008) A dictionary of linguistics and phonetics. Hoboken: John Wiley & Sons, Inc.

References

Languages of Papua New Guinea
Schouten languages